Medica Hospitals is a leading healthcare chain in Eastern India providing multi-speciality and super-speciality healthcare facilities over the past few years. Beginning its journey with Medica North Bengal Clinic in Siliguri in 2008, the Group launched its flagship Hospital – Medica Superspecialty Hospital in Kolkata in 2010.

Locations 

 Medica Superspecialty Hospital, Kolkata, West Bengal
 Medica Cancer Hospital, Rangapani, Siliguri, West Bengal
 Medica North Bengal Clinic, Siliguri, West Bengal
 Medica Magadh Hospital, Patna, Bihar
 Bhagwan Mahavir Medica Superspecialty Hospital, Ranchi, Jharkhand
 Tata Steel Medica Hospital, Kalinganagar, Odisha
 R. C. Agarwal Memorial Hospital, Tinsukia, Assam

Accolades
Medica Superspecialty Hospital, Kolkata has been recognised for its dedicated efforts towards excellence in promoting cleanliness, high standards of hygiene, sanitation and infection control. The city-based private hospital has been honoured with the Kayakalp Awards constituted by the Government of India under the category of Hospital contributing to improved quality of care. Dr. Alok Roy, Chairman of the hospital received the award from then Union Health Minister Dr. Harsh Vardhan.

References

Hospitals in Kolkata
Emergency medical services in India
Year of establishment missing